The 1997–98 Georgian Cup (also known as the David Kipiani Cup) was the fifty-fourth season overall and eighth since independence of the Georgian annual football tournament.

Round of 32 

|}

Round of 16 

|}

Quarterfinals 

|}

Semifinals 

|}

Final

See also 
 1997–98 Umaglesi Liga

References

External links 
 The Rec.Sport.Soccer Statistics Foundation.
 es.geofootball.com 

Georgian Cup seasons
Cup
Georgian Cup, 1997-98